Battle of the Saxes (subtitled Volume 1) is a live album by saxophonists Eric Kloss and Richie Cole recorded in 1976 and released on the Muse label.

Reception

AllMusic awarded the album 4 stars.

Track listing 
All compositions by Richie Cole, except as indicated.
 "Ebony Godfather" (Eric Kloss) – 9:52
 "Robin" – 11:22
 "D.C. Farewell" – 7:45
 "Harold's House of Jazz" – 13:00

Personnel 
Richie Cole, Eric Kloss – alto saxophone
Mickey Tucker – electric piano
Rick Laird – bass, electric bass
Eddie Gladden – drums

References 

1977 live albums
Eric Kloss live albums
Richie Cole (musician) live albums
Muse Records live albums
Albums produced by Michael Cuscuna